AND1 is an American footwear and clothing company specializing in basketball shoes, clothing, and sporting goods. AND1 was founded on August 13, 1993, The company focuses strictly on basketball and is a subsidiary of Sequential Brands Group. It sponsors NBA athletes, as well as numerous high school and AAU teams in the United States.

Company history

1993–2000 
In 1993, AND1 began as a graduate school project partnership of Jay Coen Gilbert, Seth Berger, and Tom Austin while they were graduate students at the University of Pennsylvania's Wharton School. The company name is derived from a phrase used by basketball broadcasters to denote a free throw awarded to a player against whom a foul has been committed while scoring a goal.

The brand started by selling T-shirts out of the back of a car. Early advertising strategies included other basketball slogans and trash talk, such as "Pass. Save Yourself The Embarrassment". They marketed their shirts to street basketball players. Foot Locker began to sell the shirts, and within the second year of launching, the business reached 1,500 stores across America.

In mid of 1996, NBA star Stephon Marbury became the first spokesman for AND1. With Marbury's signing, AND1 launched its first pair of basketball sneakers, its entry into the footwear category.

In late 1998, a videotape containing streetball stunts was delivered to AND1 by Marquise Kelly, coach of the Benjamin Cardozo High school team in Queens, New York. The tape contained low quality camera moves, poor resolution and nearly indecipherable audio featuring a streetballer by the name of Rafer Alston. At the time, Alston was a student at Fresno State who had entered the 1998 NBA Draft. The videotape would soon be known as the "Skip tape", referring to Alston's streetball nickname "Skip to my Lou". Alston later signed on with AND1.

In 1999 at Haverford College in Philadelphia, AND1 shot their first series of commercials and print ads incorporating NBA players Darrell Armstrong, Rex Chapman, Ab Osondu, Raef LaFrentz, Toby Bailey, and Miles Simon. When the traditional marketing campaign proved unsuccessful, a strategy was formed to use the "Skip tape". It was edited and reprinted into 50,000 copies, and over the next eight weeks, distributed across basketball camps, clinics, record labels. The tape would become the first "Mix Tape", and quickly made Alston into a celebrity. When AND1 became a product partner with FootAction, this strategy evolved into a national program.

Starting in the summer of 1999, a free AND1 Mix Tape was given with any purchase. Approximately 200,000 tapes were distributed in the span of 3 weeks.

2000–2010 

AND1 began to recruit more and more NBA players to wear their product, including Latrell Sprewell, Kevin Garnett and Jamal Crawford. AND1 products began appearing at Foot Locker and FootAction. By the 2001 season, AND1 was second only to Nike in market share among NBA endorsees. They later became the second-largest basketball brand in the United States only eight years after their inception.

AND1 summer tours, having begun in 1999, were expanded in 2002 into the Mixtape Tour with the release of Mixtape 3. Noted streetballers such as “Hot Sauce” and “The Professor” would go from court to court to challenge other streetballers in one-on-ones. The streetballers who prevailed through the very end of the summer tours would receive endorsement deals from AND1. From 2002 through 2008, the tours were televised live on ESPN under the name “Streetball” and competed with ESPN's “SportsCenter” for the highest ratings. The summer tours began in America but soon branched into more than 30 countries, with their products promoted in 130 countries and territories.

AND1 apparel and footwear had first appeared in the digital arena in Street Hoops in 2002, but in 2006 the brand officially made its entrance into the category, partnering with Ubisoft to release its first video game, AND 1 Streetball. A mobile version was also released by Gameloft. The game featured a story mode mirroring AND1's "Streetball" series on ESPN, where players were able to create their own basketball player and enter him in the AND 1 Mix Tape Tour in order to get a contract with the AND 1 team. Along the way, players were able to create their own stylized trick moves and pull them off with a two-analog stick system called "I BALL". The games were available on both PlayStation 2 and Xbox and received positive reviews.

2010–present 
Following a short hiatus, the AND1 Mixtape Tour returned in 2010, then known as the AND1 Live Streetball Tour. The tour continued to expand globally as the AND1 team toured the world, meeting success against most international teams and scoring wins over adversaries as diverse as Chile and Angola. They remained undefeated outside the continental United States until they lost to the debuting Puerto Rico Streetballers in 2012.

Over the years, AND1 has changed hands a few times, first being bought out by American Sporting Goods in 2005 and subsequently sold to Brown Shoe Company in February 2011. On August 25, 2011, AND1 was sold to Galaxy Brands, a brand management company based in New York. The company later merged with Sequential Brands Group, a publicly-traded brand management company, but the personnel managing AND1 never changed. Under Sequential, AND1 has reconnected with its roots, signing marquee NBA players and sponsoring tournaments worldwide. 

In November 2012, AND1 signed then-Pacer Lance Stephenson to an endorsement deal. Stephenson had won the NYC basketball championships in all four years of high school, and became New York State's all-time leading scorer in high school basketball, named Mr. New York Basketball after his senior year. He would soon sign a multi-year deal with the Indiana Pacers, with AND1 signing him during his rookie season. Born Ready fit the AND1 streetball personality with his aggressive never-back-down attitude, which was put on national display during the 2014 NBA Conference Finals. Stephenson, who had led the league in triple-doubles that year and led the Pacers past the Knicks in the round prior, was paired against the Miami Heat’s LeBron James. From trash-talking to “mind games,” to even blowing in James ear at one point, Stephenson did whatever he could to get into James’ head and under his skin.

In celebration of their 20-year anniversary, the brand hosted the AND1 Labor Day Summer Remix, a $100,000 winner-take-all basketball tournament in August 2013. The tournament took place in Temple University in Philadelphia, and also included a $10,000 dunk contest.

Paying homage to Brooklyn streetball culture, AND1 partnered with SLAM magazine to host numerous events surrounding the 2015 NBA All-Star Game (played at the Barclays Center in downtown Brooklyn). Various charity events with two of New York's greatest streetball legends Lance Stephenson and Rafer "Skip to My Lou" Alston were followed by the launch of an exclusive pop-up retail lounge on Flatbush Avenue across from Barclays Center.

Over one hundred AND1 High School and AAU teams play across America in various tournaments and leagues, and an AND1 circuit in the making.  The company's annual overall revenue is approximately $140 million.

In February 2015, AND1 signed a lease to operate a retail store at 172 Flatbush Ave in Brooklyn, directly across the street from the Barclays Center. This is the company's first street retail location.

In 2018, Kevin Garnett returned to AND1 as Creative Director and Global Ambassador.

In 2021, AND1 was acquired by Galaxy Universal.

AND1 Mixtape Tour

The AND1 Mixtape Tour has featured streetball players of fame, including Skip to My Lou, Main Event, The Professor, Hot Sauce, Spyda, 50, and AO. AND1 players have made annual tours around America to recruit the next streetball legend. This recruiting has since been edited for airing as Street Ball on ESPN and ESPN2. It is also parodied in the movie Like Mike 2: Streetball as "Game On".

The tour was televised in half-hour "Streetball" segments on ESPN2, and were compiled into highlight reels, offered under the mark AND1 Mixtape, which were sold on DVD. AND1 has released 10 volumes. The first mixtape was AND1 Mixtape Volume 1 (1998) and the most recent is AND1 Mixtape X (2008).

Following a short hiatus, the AND1 Mixtape Tour would return in 2010, now known as the AND1 Live Streetball Tour. The AND1 team has toured the world, meeting success against most international teams and scoring wins over adversaries as diverse as Chile and Angola, remaining undefeated outside the United States until they lost to the debuting Puerto Rico Streetballers in 2012.

Current sponsorship
Basketball
Fred VanVleet
Daryl Macon
Thomas Beauchamp
Norman Powell

Video games
EA Sports' NBA Street, published in 2001, featured dunks and passes in AND1 fashion, but was licensed from the NBA. In 2002, Activision announced the first AND1 video game called Street Hoops, featuring AND1 players. Gameloft has also released a mobile game based on the AND1 franchise. In 2006, Ubisoft released the second AND1 video game, AND 1 Streetball. Both games were developed by Black Ops Entertainment.

References

External links

 
Athletic shoe brands
Sportswear brands
Shoe companies of the United States
Sporting goods manufacturers of the United States
Clothing companies established in 1993
Chester County, Pennsylvania
1993 establishments in Pennsylvania
Companies based in Aliso Viejo, California
Privately held companies based in California
2018 mergers and acquisitions
Basketball culture
Companies that filed for Chapter 11 bankruptcy in 2021